

Women's 200 m Backstroke - Final

Women's 200 m Backstroke - Heats

Women's 200 m Backstroke - Heat 01

Women's 200 m Backstroke - Heat 02

Women's 200 m Backstroke - Heat 03

References

200 metres backstroke
2006 in women's swimming